The Gaza Museum of Archaeology, also known as Al Math'af (Al Mat'haf, "The Museum"), is a museum in Gaza City, Palestine, that opened to the public in fall 2008. The museum is part of a privately-owned hotel, also named Al Math'af, that includes a restaurant and conference center. The privately-owned museum houses antiquities discovered in the Gaza Strip from various historical periods.

Museum
The museum holds a collection of 350 artifacts. They date as far back as the Bronze Age (3500 BCE). Tools, columns, motifs, coins, glass and pottery from the Roman and Byzantine periods, the Islamic period, the Crusader periods, continuing through the modern era to the time of the Egyptian administration of the Gaza Strip, which ended in 1967. Each display features explanations of the artifacts in several languages, designed for specialists and laymen alike, although none of the artifacts featured on the museum's website is identified or dated. 

According to museum director, Jawdat N. Khoudary, "The idea is to show our deep roots from many cultures in Gaza. … It’s important that people realize we had a good civilization in the past. Israel has legitimacy from its history. We do, too."

Gaza does not have a law requiring rescue archaeology when construction crews happen on archaeological artifacts. As a construction company owner, Khoudary instructs his employees to save whatever they dig up so that he can search it for treasures for the museums. He also pays fishermen who bring him archaeologically interesting objects.

The New York Times describes the museum building, made partly of stones  recovered from old houses, old railroad ties and marble columns discovered by Gazan fishermen and construction workers, as "stunning".

The museum was planned to be sponsored by UNESCO, and to be funded by a board of Palestinian trustees. It receives  scientific and technical support from the Museums Division of the city of Geneva.  As of 2010 it was privately owned and operated.

Some of the museum displays are censored by the Hamas-led government of Gaza. Objects that cannot be displayed include an Aphrodite whose gown is too revealing, images of other ancient deities and oil lamps featuring menorahs.

See also 
 List of museums in Palestine

References

External links
 Al Mat'haf Website

Museums established in 2008
Archaeological museums
Museums in the Gaza Strip
Buildings and structures in Gaza City
Hotels in Gaza City
Restaurants in Gaza City